Fritillaria montana is a European species of flowering plant in the lily family Liliaceae, native to southern and eastern Europe: France, Italy, Greece, Austria, Hungary, Yugoslavia (all 7 parts), Albania, Bulgaria, Romania, Ukraine, European Russia.

References

External links
Alpine Garden Society - Plant Encyclopaedia, Fritillaria montana

montana
Flora of Europe
Plants described in 1832